The 2011–12 Ligue Inter-Régions de football is the ? season of the league under its current title and ? season under its current league division format. A total of 56 teams (14 in each group) will be contesting the league. The league is scheduled to start on September 23, 2011.

League table

Groupe West

Groupe Centre-West

Groupe Centre-Est

Groupe Est

References

Inter-Régions Division seasons
4